Melesio Morales (sometimes spelled Melisio Morales) (December 4, 1838 – May 12, 1908) was a Mexican composer.

Morales was born and died in Mexico City, where he studied music; two of his operas, written in Italian, were performed there. He lived in Europe from 1865-1868, and his success in Florence with the opera Ildegonda in 1866 made him a star in his native country. He composed, conducted, and taught in Mexico City until his death. His works include ten operas, two cantatas, and orchestral and choral works.

Operas
Note: This list is incomplete.
Romeo e Giulietta, 1860 
Ildegonda, drama lírico, 1864 
Gino Corsini, ossia La Maledizione, 1877 
Cleopatra, 1891 
Anita, ca. 1900

1838 births
1908 deaths
19th-century classical composers
20th-century classical composers
Mexican classical composers
Mexican male classical composers
Mexican Romantic composers
Musicians from Mexico City
Mexican opera composers
Male opera composers
20th-century male musicians
19th-century male musicians